The 2010 Copa do Brasil de Futebol Feminino was the fourth staging of the competition. The competition started on August 16, 2010, and will conclude on December 4, 2010. 32 clubs of all regions of Brazil participated of the cup, which is organized by the Brazilian Football Confederation (CBF). The winner of the cup represented Brazil in the 2011 Copa Libertadores de Fútbol Femenino.

Competition format
The competition was contested by 32 clubs in a knock-out format where all rounds were played over two legs and the away goals rule was used, but in the first three rounds, if the away team won the first leg with an advantage of at least three goals, the second leg would not be played and the club would be automatically qualified to the next round.

Table

Semifinals

Third-place playoff

Final

External links
 Copa do Brasil de Futebol Feminino at the Confederação Brasileira de Futebol (CBF) website
 2010 Copa do Brasil de Futebol Feminino table

2010
2010 domestic association football cups
2010 Brazilian football competitions
2010 in Brazilian women's football